Atthasālinī (Pali) is a Buddhist text composed by Buddhaghosa in the Theravada Abhidharma tradition. The title has been translated as "The Expositor" or "Providing the Meaning". In the Atthasālinī, Buddhaghosa explains the meaning of terms that occur in the Dhammasangani, a Buddhist text that is part of the Pali Canon of Theravada Buddhism.

Mental factors

Within the Atthasālinī, Buddhaghosa explains the meanings of the fifty-two mental factors (Pali: cetasikas) described in the Dhammasangani.

Translations
 Buddhaghosa, Maung Tin, et al. (1958), The Expositor, Pali Text Society

References

Sources

 
 

Aṭṭhakathā